Kay Waldo Barnes (born March 30, 1938) is a former American politician and two-term Mayor of Kansas City, Missouri, and the first woman to be elected to the office.

Biography
A native of St. Joseph, Missouri, she earned a bachelor's degree in secondary education from the University of Kansas, where she was a member of Kappa Kappa Gamma sorority, and a  master's in secondary education from the University of Missouri–Kansas City. She was president of Kay Waldo, Inc., a human resources development firm, until her retirement. She is a cousin of famous journalist Walter Cronkite.

Career
In 1974, she was one of the first two women in the Jackson County Legislature. She was elected to the Kansas City council in 1979.

Barnes was the first female mayor of Kansas City. Mayor Barnes has received the most credit for her work in improving Downtown Kansas City and working for beginning the revitalization of the urban core. She is also credited with the Sprint Center arena in Kansas City that opened on October 10, 2007. She was first elected mayor on her birthday in 1999, and re-elected for a second term in 2003. She was succeeded as mayor of Kansas City on May 1, 2007, when Mark Funkhouser took office.

At Missouri Democratic functions, beginning in April, 2007, Mayor Barnes made it clear that she was seriously considering a run for Congress in 2008, and on May 14, 2007, she officially announced her candidacy.for Missouri's 6th congressional district, held by four-term Republican Sam Graves. She had spent most of her life in the district; she lives in the 6th's portion of Kansas City, and grew up in St. Joseph, the largest city entirely in the 6th. 

She was endorsed by Emily's List. On August 5, 2008, Barnes won against Ali Allon Sherkat in the Democratic primary with 84.5% of the vote. Although the race was initially thought to be competitive, Barnes was soundly defeated, taking only 37 percent of the vote.  She even lost the district's share of Kansas City.

She is Senior Director for University Engagement at Park University.

Barnes is a Fellow of the National Academy of Public Administration.

See also
2008 United States House of Representatives elections in Missouri#District 6

References

External links
 
Missouri District 6 campaign contributions at OpenSecrets.org

1938 births
Living people
Politicians from St. Joseph, Missouri
Businesspeople from Missouri
Mayors of Kansas City, Missouri
Missouri city council members
Missouri Democrats
University of Kansas alumni
Women mayors of places in Missouri
Women city councillors in Missouri
20th-century American politicians
20th-century American women politicians
21st-century American politicians
21st-century American women politicians
Candidates in the 2008 United States elections
20th-century American businesspeople
20th-century American businesswomen
Park University faculty